Arthur Hartman may refer to:

 Arthur A. Hartman (1926–2015), American diplomat
 Arthur J. Hartman (1888–1970), American pilot and early aircraft builder